Liotyphlops ternetzii is a species of snake in the family Anomalepididae. The species is endemic to South America.

Etymology
The specific name, ternetzii, is in honor of ichthyologist Carl Ternetz (born 1870).

Geographic range
L. ternetzii is found in Argentina, Brazil, Paraguay, Suriname, and Uruguay.

Habitat

Reproduction
L. ternetzii is oviparous.

References

Further reading
Boulenger GA (1896). Catalogue of the Snakes in the British Museum (Natural History). Volume III. ... London: Trustees of the British Museum (Natural History). (Taylor and Francis, printers). xiv + 727 pp. + Plates I-XXV. (Helminthophis ternetzii, new species, p. 584).
Dixon JR, Kofron CP (1983). "The Central and South American Anomalepid [sic] Snakes of the Genus Liotyphlops ". Amphibia-Reptilia 4 (2): 241-264.
Freiberg MA (1982). Snakes of South America. Hong Kong: T.F.H. Publications. 189 pp. . (Liotyphlops ternetzii, p. 86).

Anomalepididae
Endemic fauna of Brazil
Taxa named by George Albert Boulenger
Reptiles described in 1896